Siglind Bruhn (born October 11, 1951 in Hamburg) is a German musicologist, writer and concert pianist.

Biographical Sketch
Siglind Bruhn was born in Hamburg. Her father was the engineer Ernst Bruhn, her mother the interpreter Leonore Bruhn née Kieberger. During the last two years before her high school graduation (Abitur 1970), she was a student in the piano class of Professor Eckart Besch at the Musikhochschule Hamburg. She completed her studies in the master class of Vladimir Horbowski at the Musikhochschule Stuttgart; 1975 State Examen (equivalent to a Master of Music) in piano performance and piano pedagogy. Concurrently she read Romance studies, Comparative Literature, and Philosophy at Munich University; 1976 Magister Artium (M.A.) with a thesis on the drama of Ramón del Valle-Inclán. During this time she met her future husband, the philosopher Gerhold K. Becker. In 1976-78 Siglind Bruhn wrote her first book, which links the pedagogical heritage of her teacher Horbowski with first attempts at her own research. After another four years of teaching she enrolled in the University of Vienna and the University of Music and Performing Arts Vienna for doctoral studies; 1985 Dr. phil. summa cum laude with an interdisciplinary dissertation in musical analysis and psychoanalysis. Two years later she followed her husband, who had accepted a position in Hong Kong, and taught for six years at The University of Hong Kong. During her first sabbatical (1993–1994), which she spent at the University of Michigan, USA, she was invited to join the University's Institute for the Humanities, where she is currently a Life Research Associate for Music and Modern Literatures / Music in Interdisciplinary Dialogue. In 1993 her book concerning Bach's Well Tempered Clavicle was published.

Positions
 1975-1976 Piano Teacher, City of Stuttgart Music School
 1977-1978 Piano Teacher, Conservatoire de Musique, Geneva
 1978-1982 Music Director, Community Music School, Unterhaching
 1982-1987 Director and Lecturer, Institute of Musical Interpretation, Dinkelsbühl
 1984-1987 Director and Principal Lecturer, Pianist Academy, Ansbach
 1987-1994 Director of Studies in Music, School of Vocational and Continuing Education, The University of Hong Kong
 1993-1997 Research Associate, Institute for the Humanities, Arbor The University of Michigan, Ann Arbor
 Since 1997 Life Research Associate, Institute for the Humanities, The University of Michigan, Ann Arbor

Honorary appointments
 2002-2010 Distinguished Senior Research Fellow of the Centre for Christianity and the Arts, University of Copenhagen
 2005-2009 Chercheur invité, Institut d'esthétique des arts contemporains, University of Paris 1–Sorbonne

Awards
 2001 Elected Ordinary member of the European Academy of Sciences and Arts
 2008 Honorary Doctorate (Dr. phil. h.c) from Linnaeus University, Sweden

Books (English only)
Guidelines to Piano Interpretation, Penerbit Muzikal Malaysia, 1989, .
J. S. Bach's Well-Tempered Clavier: In-depth analysis and interpretation. Mainer International, 1993.
Images and Ideas in Modern French Piano Music: The Extra-Musical Subtext in Piano Works by Ravel, Debussy and Messiaen. Pendragon, 1997. ; paperback edition 2010  -  Google
The Temptation of Paul Hindemith: Mathis der Maler as a Spiritual Testimony. Pendragon, 1998.  - 
Musical Ekphrasis: Composers Responding to Poetry and Painting, Pendragon, 2000.  - 
Musical Ekphrasis in Rilke's Marienleben, Rodopi, 2000.  - Google
Saints in the Limelight: Representations of the Religious Quest on the Post-1945 Operatic Stage, Pendragon, 2003.  - 
The Musical Order of the World: Kepler, Hesse, Hindemith, Pendragon, 2005.  - 
Messiaen's Contemplations of Covenant and Incarnation: Musical Symbols of Faith in the two great piano cycles of the 1940s, Pendragon, 2007.  - 
Messiaen's Explorations of Love and Death: Musical Signification in the Tristan Trilogy and Three related song cycles, Pendragon, 2008.  - 
Messiaen's Interpretations of Holiness and Trinity: Echoes of Medieval Theology in the Oratorio, Organ Meditations, and Opera, Pendragon, 2008.  - 
Frank Martin's Musical Reflections on Death, Pendragon 2011. . 
The Music of Jörg Widmann, Gorz 2013. . 
J. S. Bach's Well-Tempered Clavier: In-depth analysis and interpretation. (Second, completely revised edition in one volume.) Gorz 2014. . 
 Arnold Schoenberg's Journey from Tone Poems to Kaleidoscopic Sound Colors. Pendragon, 2015.  
 Debussy's Vocal Music and its Poetic Evocations. Pendragon, 2018.  
 Debussy's Instrumental Music in its Cultural Context. Pendragon, 2019.  
German-language book publications here

Essays and editorial work
Essay collections as contributing author:
Messiaen's Language of Mystical Love. New York: Garland 1998.  - Google
Encrypted Messages in Alban Berg's Music . New York: Garland 1998.  - Google
Signs in Musical Hermeneutics [special issue of The American Journal of Semiotics 13/1-4], 1998. ISSN 0277-7126
Voicing the Ineffable: Musical Representations of Religious Experience. Hillsdale, NY: Pendragon Press 2002.  - Google
Sonic Transformations of Literary Texts: From Program Music to Musical Ekphrasis. Hillsdale, NY: Pendragon Press 2008.  - Google
 Since 2000, series editor of the book series "Interplay: Music in Interdisciplinary Dialogue" published by Pendragon Press - Interplay

Performances
First solo concerts and performances with orchestras as a soloist at the age of 14. Solo and chamber concerts in almost every major city in the Federal Republic of Germany as well as in 23 other countries and on all five continents (among others in: Zurich, London, Paris, Bordeaux, Lisbon, Warsaw, Budapest, Venice, Athens, Beirut, Johannesburg, Cape Town, Rio de Janeiro, Quito, Manila, Hong Kong, Beijing, Shanghai, Melbourne, Adelaide, Washington). Recordings with most broadcasting companies in Germany and several European and other Western stations. One LP and four CDs.
 Maurice Ravel: Histoires Naturelles, Modest Mussorgsky: Songs and Dances of Death. Cornelia Kallisch, mezzo-soprano; Siglind Bruhn, piano. LM-M E 2011 1984
 Paul Hindemith: five sonatas for strings and piano. [a] Andrew Jennings, violin, [b] Yizhak Schotten, viola; [c] Bruce Smith, viola d'amore, [d] Anthony Elliott, violoncello; [e] Derek Weller, double bass; piano: Siglind Bruhn, [a ], [c], [e], Katherine Collier [b], Anton Nel [d]. Equilibrium 1995
 Paul Hindemith: five sonatas for woodwinds and piano. [a] Leone Buyse, flute, [b] Harry Sargous, oboe; [c] Fred Ormand, clarinet; [d] Harry Sargous, English horn; [e] Richard Beene, bassoon; piano: Siglind Bruhn, [a], [ b], [e], Anton Nel [c] [d]. Equilibrium 1995
 Paul Hindemith: five sonatas for piano and brass instruments. [a] Charles Darval, trumpet, [b] Bryan Kennedy, French horn, [c] Charles Darval, alto horn, [d] H. Dennis Smith, trombone, [e] Fritz Kaenzig, tuba; piano: Siglind Bruhn, [a ], [b], [e], Robert Conway [c], Anton Nel [d]. Equilibrium 1996
 Paul Hindemith: Ludus tonalis and Reihe kleiner Stücke. Siglind Bruhn, piano. Equilibrium 1996
Since 2007 she has been the musical director of an annual series of chamber music concerts in the Southwest German town of Waldkirch

References

External links
  Home page

Living people
1951 births
University of Vienna alumni
Members of the European Academy of Sciences and Arts
University of Michigan faculty
German musicologists
German classical pianists
German women pianists
State University of Music and Performing Arts Stuttgart alumni
21st-century classical pianists
Women classical pianists
Messiaen scholars
21st-century women pianists